Lio Lenzi (13 November 1898 – 26 September 1960) was an Italian politician.

He was the first Mayor of Grosseto elected after the fall of fascism and the establishment of the Republic of Italy.

Biography
Lenzi was born in Livorno and participated at the foundation of the  Italian Communist Party in 1921. He joined the anti-fascist movement Arditi del Popolo opposing the National Fascist Party blackshirts. Being persecuted after the establishment of the fascist government, Lenzi moved to Grosseto in 1926 where he started to work as glazier and kept promoting communist ideology in that city. For this reason he was beaten and severely injured by the fascists in 1937.

During World War II he joined the Resistance movement and established the Grosseto National Liberation Committee (CLN) in 1943 together with various local representatives of the other clandestine parties.

After the Allied invasion of Italy, Lenzi was appointed Mayor of Grosseto by the CLN with the approval of the Allied forces led in Grosseto by colonel R.A.B. Hamilton on 17 June 1944. He was confirmed Mayor of Grosseto on 27 March 1946 as the result of the first democratic elections held on 10 March.

See also
1946 Italian local elections
Italian resistance movement
List of mayors of Grosseto

References

Bibliography

External links 

1898 births
1960 deaths
Mayors of Grosseto
Italian Communist Party politicians